Field of View I is the first studio album by Japanese group Field of View. The album was released on December 7, 1995 by Zain Records. The album reached #1 on the Oricon  chart for its first week with 321,390 sold copies. It charted for 15 weeks and sold 628,210 copies.

Track listing

Usage in media
Kimi ga Ita Kara was used as the theme song for the Fuji TV drama "Kagayaku Kisetsu no Naka de".
Sepia was used in a TV commercial for the 1996 "Toei Anime Fair" to promote Dragon Ball: The Path to Power.
Totsuzen was used in a commercial for Pocari Sweat.
Think of myself was used in a commercial for the "Astel Kansai Corporation".
Mayowanaide was used as the ending theme for the TV Asahi program "Mokugeki! Dokyun".

Cover
Zard covered "Totsuzen" and "Kimi ga Ita kara" on their album Today Is Another Day.

References 

1995 debut albums
Being Inc. albums
Japanese-language albums
Field of View albums